Chand Chakori  is a 1945 Indian Bollywood film. It was the sixth highest grossing Indian film of 1945.

References

External links
 

1945 films
1940s Hindi-language films
Indian drama films
1945 drama films
Indian black-and-white films
Films directed by Kidar Sharma
Hindi-language drama films